Tu mi turbi (also known as You Upset Me and You Disturb Me) is a 1983 Italian anthology comedy film written, directed and starred by Roberto Benigni. It is both the directorial debut of Benigni and the film debut of Nicoletta Braschi.

Plot summary 
The film is divided into four episodes. In the first of these, the pastor Benigno is called by Mary of Nazareth and Joseph to take care of the newborn baby Jesus, who proves to be a brat. He performs a spiteful miracle series, including that of floating in the tub where he has to swim. Benigno confesses to the baby to being hopelessly in love with Mary, but he has to resign, because the Madonna has now taken a husband.

The tramp Benigno desperately searches for his beloved angel of heaven named Angela. When he gets information from other angels about the pure soul, Benigno discovers that she is in love with God, and that the two are getting married.

The unemployed Benigno goes to the bank to get a loan for the purchase of a home. He is sent by the bank manager, but Benigno doesn't understand the system of bank lending, leading to a series of comical misunderstandings. At the end the manager is exasperated and orders to put Benigno in jail.

The two soldiers Benigno and Claudio are doing the night guard in Rome, at the Altar of the Fatherland, the tomb of the Unknown Soldier. The two begin chatting about communists, and after some reasoning about death in war, Benigno demonstrates with great wonder that God exists.

Cast 
Roberto Benigni: Benigno
Olimpia Carlisi: Angela
Claudio Bigagli: soldier
Nicoletta Braschi: Mary
Carlo Monni: Joseph
Giacomo Piperno: bank manager Diotaiuti
Serena Grandi 
Mariangela D'Abbraccio

References

External links

1983 films
1983 comedy films
Films directed by Roberto Benigni
Italian anthology films
Italian comedy films
1983 directorial debut films
Portrayals of Jesus in film
Portrayals of the Virgin Mary in film
1980s Italian-language films
1980s Italian films